Salvo is a 2013 Italian drama film written and directed by Fabio Grassadonia and Antonio Piazza. It won the Critics' Week Grand Prize at the 2013 Cannes Film Festival.

Cast 
 Saleh Bakri as Salvo
 Sara Serraiocco as Rita
 Mario Pupella as The Boss
 Giuditta Perriera as Mimma Puleo
 Luigi Lo Cascio as Enzo Puleo

See also  
 List of Italian films of 2013

References

External links

2013 films
2013 drama films
Italian drama films
French drama films
2010s Italian-language films
Films set in Sicily
Mafia films
Films about blind people
2010s Italian films
2010s French films